Chicoana is a department located in Salta Province, in northwestern Argentina.

With an area of  it is one of the smallest departments of the province. It borders to the north with the departments of Cerrillos, and Rosario de Lerma, to the east with Capital Department, to the south with La Viña and to the west with the departments of Cachi and San Carlos.

Towns and municipalities
 Chicoana
 El Carril
 Escoipe
 Viñaco
 Calvimonte
 Agua Negra
 El Maray
 El Nogalar
 La Zanja
 Pulares
 San Fernando de Escoipe
 San Martín
 El moyar 
 Chivilme
 Bella vista
 Los Los
 Peñaflor
 Potrero de Díaz

References

External links 

 Departments of Salta Province website

Departments of Salta Province